Ethmia aurifluella is a moth in the family Depressariidae. It is found in Morocco, Asia Minor, Syria, Iran, the Iberian Peninsula, France, Switzerland, Austria, Italy, Albania, North Macedonia, Bulgaria, Greece, Turkey, Romania, Ukraine and southern Russia.

The larvae feed on Thalictrum and Anchusa species.

References

Moths described in 1810
aurifluella
Moths of Europe
Moths of Asia
Moths of Africa